The 1957 Tennessee Volunteers (variously Tennessee, UT, or the Vols) represented the University of Tennessee in the 1957 NCAA University Division football season. Playing as a member of the Southeastern Conference (SEC), the team was led by head coach Bowden Wyatt, in his third year, and played their home games at Shields–Watkins Field in Knoxville, Tennessee. They finished the season with a record of eight wins and three losses (8–3 overall, 4–3 in the SEC) and with a victory over Texas A&M in the 1957 Gator Bowl.

Schedule

Team players drafted into the NFL

References

Tennessee
Tennessee Volunteers football seasons
Gator Bowl champion seasons
Tennessee Volunteers football